The 1950 Carrera Panamericana was a motor race held in Mexico from 5 May to 10 May 1950. It was the first edition of the Carrera Panamericana.

Background

After the Mexican section of the Panamerican Highway was completed in 1950, a nine-stage, six-day race across the country was organized by the Mexican government to advertise this feat and to attract international business into Mexico. Antonio Cornejo, a Pontiac dealer in Mexico City, was the general manager of the event.

Drivers

Racers from the US, Italy, France, Spain, Venezuela, Colombia, Guatemala, Peru and obviously, Mexico. The Formula 1 drivers Piero Taruffi and Felice Bonetto took part in the race. Also Bill France, the founder of NASCAR. Other NASCAR drivers participated as Hershel McGriff, Curtis Turner. The sporcar racer Jean Trévoux took part too.

The route

The first race ran from north to south, beginning in Ciudad Juárez, Chihuahua, across the international border from El Paso, Texas, and finishing in El Ocotal, Chiapas, (now known as Cd. Cuauhtémoc) on the Guatemala-Mexico border opposite from La Mesilla, Guatemala. At least one stage was run each day for six consecutive days.

Results

The first three places were won by American cars and American drivers. Though less powerful, the car was substantially lighter than its big Lincoln and Cadillac competitors, meaning that it would eventually pull away from them on the steep, winding course. The car (which had cost McGriff only $1,900, when the winner's purse was $17,000), had another advantage in its weight – it was much easier to stop, meaning that McGriff finished the race on his original brake shoes when the big cars were re-shoeing every night. The reason that this was so important was that neither McGriff nor his co-driver were capable of even the most basic maintenance to the car. McGriff also noted that the control afforded by his manual gearbox gave him a significant advantage the last day on the gravel roads in Chiapas, when he finally passed the Cadillac leading the race. The best placed European car, in fourth position, was an Alfa Romeo 6C driven by Italian driver Piero Taruffi.

Stages

Fatalities

In this edition four people were killed. A four-year-old Juan Altamirano was hit by the car of Jesús Valezzi and Adolfo Dueñas Costa in the first stage in Cd. Juárez before the start of the race.

In the same stage near to finish line the Guatemalan Enrique Hachmeister lost the control of his Lincoln.

The Peruvian co-driver Jesús Reyes Molina died in the fourth stage in León, Guanajuato when the Nash of Henry Charles Bradley crashed with a bridge in the Florida river. Reyes Molina was taken to León Hospital, where he died.

The Nash Ambassador driven by the Americans Eddie Sollohub-Nicholeo Scott hit the crowd and killed a spectator in the fourth stage.

References

Carrera Panamericana
Carrera Panamericana
Carrera Panamericana
May 1950 sports events in North America
May 1950 events in Mexico